Royal Melbourne Yacht Squadron is a yacht club located at St Kilda Beach in the suburb of St. Kilda in Melbourne, Australia. The squadron was founded in 1876. It has occupied its grounds on Pier Road in St Kilda since prior to incorporation.

History
Sailing began on the approximate site of the current Royal Melbourne Yacht Squadron club house in the 1870s. The St Kilda Sailing Club was incorporated in 1876. It changed its name to St Kilda Yacht Club in 1884. After the grant of a royal warrant on 9 April 1924, the name of the club was again changed to Royal St Kilda Yacht Club. The Royal St Kilda Yacht Club amalgamated with the St Kilda 14-Foot Sailing Club in June 1961 and adopted the current name "Royal Melbourne Yacht Squadron". The Squadron was registered as a company limited by guarantee under the National Companies Code on 21 February 1983. The squadron was the control centre for the 1956 Melbourne Olympic Games yachting events.

Purpose
The squadron has been promoting the sport of sailing and providing sailing facilities to members since the 1870s.

Sailing is mostly in keel boats with some off the beach and junior sailing available. The club organises races on Port Phillip throughout the year on Saturdays, Wednesdays and some Sundays.

The squadron has a floating marina in St. Kilda Harbour, constructed in 2014, with about 250 pens. The squadron also manages approximately 115 swing moorings located in St. Kilda Harbour.

Weather station
A Bureau of Meteorology weather station, which is limited to wind speed only, is located on top of the club house.

References

External links
Royal Melbourne Yacht Squadron

1876 establishments in Australia
Organisations based in Australia with royal patronage
Yacht clubs in Victoria (Australia)
Sports clubs established in 1876
Sporting clubs in Melbourne
St Kilda, Victoria
Sport in the City of Port Phillip
Buildings and structures in the City of Port Phillip